V (also known as V: The Series) is an American science fiction television series that aired in the United States on NBC from October 26, 1984, to March 22, 1985. It is a continuation of the V franchise about an alien invasion of Earth by a carnivorous race of reptilians known as "Visitors", which was originally conceived by American writer, producer, and director Kenneth Johnson. Johnson, however, was not involved in the production of the weekly series.

Plot
Following directly on from the events of the mini-series V (The Final Battle), the alien Diana escapes from her captured mothership in a shuttle, but is pursued by resistance member Mike Donovan. After a short fight, Donovan captures her.

One year after the day the Red Dust was deployed, now the international holiday called "Liberation Day", the former members of the Resistance and their Fifth Column allies have gone their separate ways and are each looking forward to prosperous careers and bright futures. As Diana is about to be put on trial for the atrocities she committed during the First Invasion, the company responsible for mass production of the Red Dust, Science Frontiers, has her abducted and taken to a secret cabin in the woods outside Los Angeles, where the company's CEO, Nathan Bates, offers Diana better accommodations in exchange for providing him with access to alien technology.

Donovan and Martin, meanwhile, pursue Nathan's agents in a stolen helicopter. After reaching the cabin, Donovan is knocked unconscious by Martin, who wants Diana dead. Before Martin can kill her, Diana is able to overpower him, stealing his pistol. She forces him to surrender his last antidote pill so she can temporarily survive on Earth and then shoots him, enabling her escape to the Southwest Tracking Station.

Martin tells Donovan about Diana's plan to contact the Visitor Fleet moments before his death, and Donovan sets off after her on foot. Donovan meets Ham Tyler, on Bates' payroll, and the two agree to pursue Diana together. Their attempts to stop her fail, and Diana escapes to a shuttle sent by a Visitor fleet hidden behind the Moon. Diana takes command and launches a full-scale invasion of Earth. She learns that the Red Dust bacterium needs freezing temperatures to regenerate, meaning that Visitor troops can safely attack Los Angeles and other cities in warmer climates.

The Resistance assembles once more, now fighting the Visitors nationwide and also contending with the power-hungry Bates, who has used the power vacuum left behind by the collapse of the government to become governor of Los Angeles, declared an open city to both sides. The Resistance fights however it can, often joined by other rebel groups. Although 50% of the Earth is still protected from The Visitors by the Red Dust, the Resistance cannot use any more of it due to the toxic long-term effects it will have on the environment. Meanwhile, Elizabeth, who has transformed yet again and now looks like a young adult, becomes increasingly important in the cause for Earth's freedom, eventually controlling the destiny of both races and deciding the outcome of the conflict.

Cast and characters
Many of the cast from the original miniseries and V: The Final Battle reprised their role in the weekly series. The only character to be played by a different actor was Sean Donovan (Nicky Katt replaced Eric Johnston in the role).

Main cast
 Jane Badler as Diana – Supreme Commander of the Visitors
 Marc Singer as Mike Donovan – Co-Leader of the Resistance (former TV cameraman)
 Faye Grant as Juliet Parrish – Founder of the Resistance (former medical student) 
 Robert Englund as Willie – Visitor Resistance member
 June Chadwick as Lydia (episodes 2–8; 10-19) – Fleet security officer sent by the Leader to Earth to commence the second invasion, she resents Diana's disobedience of command.
 Michael Wright as Elias Taylor (episodes 1–11) – A now semi-retired Resistance member, Elias runs the Club Creole restaurant, which becomes the informal headquarters of the Resistance. Continuing to sympathize with the Resistance, Elias provides employment and safe refuge to Willie and Elizabeth. Club Creole is destroyed by a Visitor raid and Elias is later killed attempting to rescue Robin Maxwell.
 Lane Smith as Nathan Bates (episodes 1–13) – CEO of biotech company Science Frontiers, which mass-produced the Red Dust toxin. Bates' thirst for power sees him consistently blackmail Diana to gain control of the Los Angeles area, which becomes an "open city." He is killed by his henchman, Mr. Chiang.
 Jeff Yagher as Kyle Bates (episodes 3–19) – The disowned rebel son of Nathan Bates, Kyle joins the Resistance, eventually becoming one of its leaders. He falls in love with Elizabeth, and then apparently stows away on The Leader's spacecraft to follow her when she goes into space.
 Michael Ironside as Ham Tyler (episodes 1–12) – A former CIA agent and Resistance hitman, he is actually in the employ of Nathan Bates as a hitman when the series begins. He soon defects back to the Resistance, but is captured and undergoes conversion by Charles to assassinate Mike. The assassination attempt is unsuccessful, and Ham later departs for Chicago with Chris and Robin. The Ham Tyler character was to have returned in the unfilmed final episode of the first season, although there is no information on whether Ironside would have reprised the role.
 Jennifer Cooke as the post-metamorphosis Elizabeth (episode 2–19) – She searches for her mother, Robin. She falls in love with Kyle, which is complicated by Robin's own attraction to him. Elizabeth possesses supernatural powers, which she uses to assist the Resistance. She communicates and meets with the Leader to negotiate peace.
 Blair Tefkin as Robin Maxwell (episodes 1–12) – Elizabeth's mother. At the start of the series, Robin has gone missing. She reunites with Elizabeth after the latter's metamorphosis, but tension soon runs high between mother and daughter after Robin learns that Kyle, to whom she is attracted, has eyes for Elizabeth. Robin and Elizabeth eventually reconcile. After another Visitor tries to impregnate her, Robin leaves Los Angeles for Chicago in the company of Chris Farber and Ham Tyler.

Supporting cast
The following cast appear in multiple episodes:

 Frank Ashmore as Martin and twin brother Philip (episodes 1; 14–19 and 20 unfilmed) – A Fifth Column leader and friend of Mike, Martin attempts to assassinate a captured Diana, but she manages to kill him and escape from the Resistance. Martin's identical twin, Philip, is an Inspector General who comes to Earth to investigate the murder of Supreme Commander Charles. Philip himself eventually joins the Fifth Column.
 Aki Aleong as Mr. Chiang (episodes 5–12) – A henchman of Nathan Bates, Chiang is tasked mainly with tracking Kyle. While Bates is in a coma from being shot accidentally during a plot to assassinate Mike, Chiang betrays Bates and makes a deal with the Visitors. The deal sees Chiang murder Bates in order to gain control of Los Angeles. Kyle later kills Chiang as revenge for his father's death.
 Mickey Jones as Chris Farber (episodes 9-11) – Best friend of Ham Tyler, he continues to aid the Resistance. He eventually leaves for Chicago with Ham and Robin.
 Jenny Beck as young Elizabeth, the Starchild (episode 1,2,4,9) – She retreats into a cocoon by the end of the first episode to undergo metamorphosis. Beck makes another brief appearance as the young version of a clone of Elizabeth that Diana produces to serve her own ends.
 Michael Durrell as Robert Maxwell (episodes 1–2) – The scientist father of Robin and grandfather of Elizabeth, Robert is mortally wounded and sacrifices himself to stop the Triax superweapon, saving Los Angeles from destruction.
 Duncan Regehr as Charles (episodes 10–13) – Personal envoy of the Leader and a member of the Royal House of Raman, he is sent by the Leader to take over military operations from Diana. He schemes to wipe out the Resistance and kill Mike Donovan. Suave and charismatic, Charles is known as a ladies' man. Annoyed at Diana's defiance of him, he uses his power of betrothal to order her to marry him within 12 hours, so that she will be forced to return to the Homeworld to bear his offspring. After seeing her naked in a ceremonial bath prior to the wedding, however, he changes his mind and arranges for her to stay. Charles dies after Diana, who correctly suspected that Lydia would try to assassinate her by poisoning the wine in her ceremonial chalice, switches her cup with his; Charles drinks the wine and realizes too late that it has been poisoned.
 Peter Elbling as Oswald (episodes 15; 17–18 and 20 unfilmed) – Visitor underling of Diana, he is a mortician and an interior decorator. Diana had him "procure" several sexual partners for her pleasure, a job he enjoyed immensely. He displays traits of a very flamboyant and openly homosexual man, but had enough modesty and morals to eschew what he considered stereotypical gay behavior, such as "bathhousing and barbarism." Nevertheless, he did enjoy indulging in sexual pleasures on occasion.
 Judson Scott as Lieutenant James (episodes 11–19 and 20 unfilmed) – Lieutenant Visitor with ambitious goals who beds Diana to climb to the top.
 Nicky Katt as Sean Donovan (episodes 4,5) – The son of Mike Donovan, previously converted by Diana and released as a spy in the Resistance. He was later re-captured by the Visitors from a boarding school at Ojai at the start of the series (not seen on screen but discussed). He resists his father's attempts to rescue him.
 Howard K. Smith as himself (episodes 3–13) – Smith appeared briefly at beginning of several episodes playing a newscaster (his former real-life profession) describing recent (off-camera) actions by the Visitors and the Fifth Column, sometimes providing expositional background for events in that night's episode. He did not interact with any of the other characters.

Intro
The title sequence for Episodes 1–13 featured theme music derived from incidental music previously used in The Final Battle over the main cast credits.

With Episode 14, a new intro was introduced with Michael Ironside, Lane Smith, Blair Tefkin and Michael Wright removed from the credits along with different theme music and a new monologue describing the premise of the show:

They arrived in 50 motherships offering their friendship and advanced technology to Earth. Skeptical of the Visitors, Mike Donovan and Juliet Parrish infiltrated their ranks and soon discovered some startling secrets.
Juliet Parrish: They're shipping food!
The Resistance is all that stands between us and the Visitors.

Episodes

Aftermath
Although the show had been cancelled in March 1985, the sets from the production remained in storage for some time as discussions transpired over rendering a conclusion to the V saga. Among the options explored were a stand-alone TV movie or a final miniseries. Several scenarios were discussed:

 The Resistance goes to the Visitor homeworld and attempt to stop Diana from assassinating the Leader
 An exploration of the aftermath of the peace treaty in "The Return". A hardline US government would impose harsh conditions on the Visitors who choose to remain behind after their race departed, leaving the Resistance to ally with them 

In 1989, there was a proposed sequel series by J. Michael Straczynski entitled "V: The Next Chapter" that would have followed up five years after the conclusion of the original show. Ham Tyler would have been the only character to have returned and would have taken place in Chicago. The rest of the remaining cast had been temporarily or permanently written off, with Mike Donovan captured, Willie executed, Lydia assassinated, Julie living in exile in Australia, Diana reassigned, and Elizabeth having died. Warner Brothers ultimately passed on the project.

Reception
In the Nielsen ratings, V'''s initial episode made its debut at a mediocre 34th place, tied with three other shows. By episode 13, it had slipped to 53rd place. For the season, V finished ranked 57th with a 12.5 rating/18 share.

On Rotten Tomatoes, V has an aggregate score of 67% based on 16 positive and 8 negative critic reviews. The website’s consensus reads: "Indefinitely postponing the apocalypse, V fully sheds its original self-seriousness -- along with much of its production value -- and settles into solid camp." The St. Louis Post-Dispatch wrote: "... a TV series with so much promise – based on two successful, highly rated science fiction miniseries on NBC in the early 1980s – produced such a silly, loathsome mess ... NBC tried to make a weekly series out of [the mini-series that unraveled] the show so terribly it must surely rank as one of the worst TV sci-fi experiments ever. The cast becomes dangerously unstable. Ironside quits in the middle of the show's run with no apparent reason. Others are killed without meaning. The special effects are cheapened and the use of stock footage – previously filmed scenes used again and again – is maddening. (At one point, they actually used stock footage from the previous week's episode.) ...
What was once a pretty decent science fiction saga with good drama, humor and suspense ends up becoming "Dynasty" with lizard makeup and laser guns. There's even an episode in which Diana marries her alien boss named (what else?) Charles."

Production notes

 Despite the high budget, producers had only half the resources given to the production of V: The Final Battle. Executive Story Consultant David Ambromowitz stated, “The budget for the mini-series was about double what we had per hour, so that's what was really difficult. It's impossible to retain the quality of the show with half the money, half the time to shoot things, half the special effects, half the sets, half the characters and half of everything.” 
 Liberation Day's shot of the alien fleet hiding behind the moon was achieved using models (the 30-inch Saucer in the foreground, newly built smaller ships behind and a 36-inch model of the moon's surface) as the budget was insufficient for optical compositing.
 The TV series' single season was released on LaserDisc in Japan in April 1989 (bilingual English/Japanese with subtitles) as a massive 10-disc box set, which included a "Diana Special" (in Japanese only) on side 20. It was later issued on Region 1 DVD in 2004, and Region 2 in 2008.
 The weekly series reused a lot of action footage from the mini-series. This was especially evident in the Visitor skyfighter chase scene in the pilot episode, where nearly all external shots were lifted from the climax scene of the original mini-series.
 In the original mini-series and The Final Battle'', the Visitors' voices were given, among other post-processing, a pitch shift effect. This was dropped from the weekly series, though no explanation was given as to why the Visitors now sounded like humans.

Comic book
DC Comics published 18 issues of a "V" comic book concurrently with the TV series.

Toys and Collectibles
A 1985 LJN toy line dedicated to the V series was to have been produced, however a March 24, 1985 UPI article on the risks of toy franchising cited that the V line was “not presently in production”.

Awards and nominations

References

External links

1980s American science fiction television series
1984 American television series debuts
1985 American television series endings
Alien invasions in television
NBC original programming
Television series by Warner Bros. Television Studios
Television shows set in Los Angeles
1984